Benjamin Franklin Callahan (May 19, 1957 – January 9, 2007) was a Major League Baseball pitcher.  The right-hander was drafted by the New York Yankees in the 31st round of the 1980 amateur draft, then traded to the Oakland Athletics on June 15, 1983.  One week later he made his major league debut with the A's.

Out of the four games he pitched for Oakland (two starts), Callahan's second outing was his best.  On June 27, 1983, he pitched six innings and gave up just one earned run in a 7–1 victory over the Kansas City Royals.  This took place in front of 21,841 fans at the Oakland–Alameda County Coliseum.  The losing pitcher was Larry Gura.

In his other three games, he gave up 12 earned runs in just 3.1 innings and the 26-year-old was sent back to the minor leagues, never to return to the major league level.  His final totals include a 1–2 record in 9.1 innings pitched, two strikeouts (Amos Otis and Billy Sample), and an earned run average of 12.54.

External links
Career statistics and player information from Baseball Reference, or Baseball Reference (Minors), or The Baseball Cube, or Retrosheet. or Pura Pelota (Venezuelan Winter League)

1957 births
2007 deaths
Baseball players from North Carolina
Catawba Indians baseball players
Columbus Clippers players
Fort Lauderdale Yankees players
Greenville Braves players
Las Vegas Stars (baseball) players
Major League Baseball pitchers
Nashville Sounds players
Navegantes del Magallanes players
American expatriate baseball players in Venezuela
Oakland Athletics players
Paintsville Yankees players
People from Mount Airy, North Carolina
Tacoma Tigers players